Gaudet Mater Ecclesia (Latin for "Mother Church Rejoices") is John XXIII's opening speech of the Second Vatican Council.

Pope John opened the council by this speech on October 11, 1962.

In the speech, he rejected the thoughts of "prophets of doom who are always forecasting disaster" in the world and in the future of the Church. He exhorted the Council Fathers "to make use of the medicine of mercy rather than the weapons of severity" in the documents they would produce for the council.

Gaudet Mater Ecclesia stated the purpose of the Second Vatican Council to be defending and presenting the sacred deposit of Christian doctrine: The greatest concern of the Ecumenical Council is this, that the sacred deposit of Christian doctrine should be more effectively defended and presented.

The document previewed what Pope John Paul II would later call the New evangelization.

References

External links
Original text

Documents of the Second Vatican Council